The Dozaleh (Persian: دوزَله) is an Iranian-Kurdish folk instrument. The dozaleh is made of two pipes. One of them produces melody and the other harmony. It sounds like a Ney-anbān and it is very dynamic.

The instrument is played in the Middle East among  the Kurdish people, and further east it is included in the music traditions of the Tajik and Uzbek peoples.

Names
The instrument is called Dozaleh (دو زَله) in Kurdistan, from zal (زَل), the Kurdish word for the stem of the zal reed.

The instrument goes by a variety of names in Iran. It is known as Jannati (Persian, "pair": جفتی) in Hormozgan, Do Ney (Persian, "two reeds": دو نی) in Lorestan, Do Sazeh (Persian, "two structures": دو سازه) in South Khorasan Province, and Ghoshmeh (Persian: قوشمه) among Khorasan's Kurdish people.

Ghoshmeh may have come from the tradition of making the instruments from the bones of birds, although one linguist suggests other possibilities, including "pair."

Ghoshmeh

History
Dozaleh or (Donay in Kurdish) is a very old instrument that is one of the first Iranian wind instruments.
In Kurdish areas, this instrument is made from a plant called Zaleh, which grows near rivers.

In modern times, the instrument's body has also been made from aluminum or copper tubes.

The instrument has been seen as sufficiently important to Iranian culture and history to encourage interest in it, through placement on the Iran National Heritage List. It is placed in works of North Khorasan in the "field of intangible cultural heritage", item 1543: Techniques and skills of making Ghoshmeh local instrument.

Playing
This instrument has 5 to 7 holes in each reed. It is played by three middle fingers of both hands, which are placed on the holes of the instrument.  The thumbs take the instrument from behind. The musician puts the instrument's reed "tongue" inside his mouth and blows into it.

See also
 in Persian
 Kurdish

References

 Hamshahrionline (Persian: همشهری آنلاین), online version of the Hamshahri Iranian daily paper. Article from 20 February 2017: Familiarity with Dozle instrument (آشنایی با ساز دوزله)
Global Minstrels: Voices of World Music. Elijah Wald. 2012. p. 227. .

External links
Interview with Ali Khan Yazdani (born in North Khorasanprovince) who makes the Ghoshmeh form of the instrument and plays it. He describes his choice of bone for the instrument. (Article is in Persian.)

Iranian musical instruments
Kurdish musical instruments
Single-reed instruments
Kurdish words and phrases